Vizianagaram railway station (station code:VZM) is an Indian railway station located in the Indian state of Andhra Pradesh; it serves Vizianagaram city in Vizianagaram district. It is one of the important railway stations on Howrah–Chennai main line, serving as the point where links from Raipur and Jharsuguda via Titlagarh connect to the main line. It is administered under South Coast Railway zone.

History

Main line 
Between 1893 and 1896,  of the South Eastern Railway was opened for traffic. In 1898–99, Bengal Nagpur Railway was  linked to the lines in southern India. It was during this period that Vizianagaram station came up.

Branch line 
The  Vizianagaram–Parvatipuram line was opened in 1908–09.

Electrification 
The Palasa–Tilaru, Srikakulam Road–Chiprupalle and Chirupalle–Alamanda sectors were electrified in 1998–99. The Srikakulam Road–Tilaru sector was electrified in 1999–2000.

Classification 

Vizianagaram Junction railway station is classified as an A–category station in the Waltair railway division.

Railway reorganization 
The Bengal Nagpur Railway was nationalized in 1944.Eastern Railway was formed on 14 April 1952 with the portion of East Indian Railway Company east of Mughalsarai and the Bengal Nagpur Railway. In 1955, South Eastern Railway was carved out of Eastern Railway. It comprised lines mostly operated by BNR earlier. Amongst the new zones started in April 2003 were East Coast Railway and South East Central Railway. Both these railways were carved out of South Eastern Railway. South Coast Railway was carved out of East Coast Railway and South Central Railway on 27 Feb 2019.

References

External links 
 

Railway stations in Vizianagaram district
Railway stations in Waltair railway division
Railway stations in India opened in 1900
Vizianagaram
1900 establishments in India
Uttarandhra